The 2017 Pan American Track Cycling Championships took place at the National Cycling Centre, in Couva, Trinidad & Tobago,  from 30 August to 3 September 2017. The event served as a qualifier for the 2018 Central American and Caribbean Games and the United States won the event.

Medal summary

Men

Women

Medal table

References

External links
Results

Americas
Cycling
Pan American Road and Track Championships
International sports competitions hosted by Trinidad and Tobago
August 2017 sports events in North America
September 2017 sports events in North America